Crossotus xanthoneurus is a species of beetle in the family Cerambycidae. It was described by Sama in 2000. It is known from Egypt, Jordan and Israel.

References

xanthoneurus
Beetles described in 2000